Konstantin Kravchuk and Denys Molchanov were the defending champions but lost in the first round to Toshihide Matsui and Vishnu Vardhan.

Yaraslav Shyla and Andrei Vasilevski won the title after defeating Mikhail Elgin and Alexander Kudryavtsev 6–4, 6–4 in the final.

Seeds

Draw

References
 Main Draw

President's Cup - Doubles
2016 Men's Doubles